is a railway station located in the city of Ichinoseki, Iwate Prefecture, Japan, operated by the East Japan Railway Company (JR East).

Lines
Orikabe Station is served by the Ōfunato Line, and is located 47.6 rail kilometers from the terminus of the line at Ichinoseki Station.

Station layout
The station has two opposed side platforms connected to the station building by a level crossing. The platforms are unnumbered. The station is unattended.

Platforms

History
Orikabe Station opened on September 2, 1928. The station was absorbed into the JR East network upon the privatization of the Japan National Railways (JNR) on April 1, 1987. A new station building was completed in November 2007.

Surrounding area
 
Mount Murone
Murone Kirameki Park

See also
 List of Railway Stations in Japan

References

External links

  

Railway stations in Iwate Prefecture
Ōfunato Line
Railway stations in Japan opened in 1928
Ichinoseki, Iwate
Stations of East Japan Railway Company